David Cubillas Peña (born 19 June 1990) is a Spanish professional footballer who plays for CD Castellón as a forward.

Club career
Born in Castellón de la Plana, Valencian Community, Cubillas represented Villarreal CF as a youth, and made his debut for the C-team in Tercera División during the 2009–10 season. In 2010, he was loaned to Segunda División B side Benidorm CF for one year.

On 21 July 2011, Cubillas joined another reserve team, Deportivo Fabril also in the fourth tier. He subsequently represented RCD Espanyol B and Huracán Valencia CF before returning to Villarreal and its C-side on 1 February 2014.

On 29 July 2015, after spending the 2014–15 campaign at the service of Villarreal CF B, Cubillas returned to Huracán. The following 12 January, however, he moved to fellow third division side UD Melilla.

On 28 July 2017, Cubillas joined hometown side CD Castellón in the fourth division, on a one-year deal. He helped the side achieve promotion to the third division in his first season by scoring a career-best 20 goals, and to Segunda División in his third; on 22 May 2019, he extended his contract until 2021.

Cubillas made his professional debut on 12 September 2020 at the age of 30, coming on as a late  substitute and scoring a last-minute winner in a 2–1 away win against SD Ponferradina.

References

External links

1990 births
Living people
Sportspeople from Castellón de la Plana
Spanish footballers
Footballers from the Valencian Community
Association football forwards
Segunda División players
Primera Federación players
Segunda División B players
Tercera División players
Villarreal CF C players
Benidorm CF footballers
Deportivo Fabril players
RCD Espanyol B footballers
Huracán Valencia CF players
Villarreal CF B players
UD Melilla footballers
CD Castellón footballers